The Solleks River is a river in the U.S. state of Washington. It is a tributary of the Clearwater River, which in turn flows into the Queets River.

Course
It flows west to join the Clearwater River near Upper Clearwater Campground.

See also
 List of rivers in Washington

References

Rivers of Washington (state)
Rivers of Jefferson County, Washington